Kaise Kaise Rishte is a 1993 Bollywood film starring Ayesha Jhulka.

Cast
Shahbaz Khan as Ravi
Ayesha Jhulka as Pooja
Sumeet Pathak as Raja (child artist)
Vikas Anand as Advocate
Satyendra Kapoor as Khanna
Kiran Kumar as Verma
Shakti Kapoor as Bankelal
Sanam as Pinky Verma
Satish Shah as Chopat
Jayshree T. as Bankelal's wife
Ram Mohan as Pooja's father
Goga Kapoor as Ravi’s uncle
Rohini Hattangadi as Ravi's mother

Soundtrack
"Bhiga Hai Mausam Khali Hai Ghar" - Alisha Chinai, Kumar Sanu
"Ho Gaya Hai Pyar Ka Mausam Jawan" * Kumar Sanu, Alka Yagnik
"Kaise Kaise Rishte" (Sad) - Mohammed Aziz
"Na Mang Diya Gora" - Alka Yagnik
"Nazuk Hu Meri Kalai Ko" - Sapna Mukherjee
"Phulo Se Zyada Hasin Hai" - Alka Yagnik, Kumar Sanu
"Rab Ne To Bas Banaya Tha Rishta" - Mohammed Aziz

References

External links
 

1993 films
Films scored by Nadeem–Shravan
1990s Hindi-language films